The Big Salmon River is a tributary of the Yukon River The encampment of Big Salmon Village lies at the confluence of the Big Salmon and Yukon Rivers.

Geography and ecology
Black spruce is a dominant tree in the Big Salmon River watershed. This locale near the Seward Peninsula represents the near westernmost limit of the Black Spruce, Picea mariana, one of the most widespread conifers in northern North America.

See also
List of rivers of Yukon

References
 C. Michael Hogan, Black Spruce: Picea mariana, GlobalTwitcher.com, ed. Nicklas Stromberg, November, 2008
 Parks Canada. 1976. Wild Rivers: Yukon Territory, Published by Wild Rivers Survey, Planning Division, Parks Canada, 84 pages
 Scott R. Robinson. 1988. Movement and Distribution of Western Arctic Caribou Herd across the Buckland Valley and Nulato Hills, U.S. Bureau of Land Management Open file Report 23, Alaska

Line notes

Rivers of Yukon
Tributaries of the Yukon River